France Bezlaj (September 19, 1910 – April 27, 1993) was a Slovenian linguist.

He was born in Litija. He received a degree in Slavic studies at the Faculty of Arts in Ljubljana and Prague, and a PhD in 1939 with a dissertation on Slovene phonetics titles Oris slovenskega knjižnega izgovora (A Description of Standard Slovene Pronunciation). From 1958 to 1980 he worked as a professor of comparative Slavic linguistics at the Faculty of Arts in Ljubljana. In 1964 he became a regular member of the Slovene Academy of Sciences and Arts. He was the founder and editor of the journal Onomastica Jugoslavica (1969–1991). After specializing in phonetics during his studies in Prague, he later devoted himself to onomastics and etymology.

Bezlaj published the founding work of Slovene onomastics  (Slovenian Hydronyms; vol. 1 in 1956, volume 2 in 1961). He discovered numerous parallels in various areas of Slavic territory by studying lexical elements in Slovene and Serbo-Croatian, pointing out traces of various linguistically heterogeneous strata reflecting older and younger Proto-Slavic migrations waves. He also worked on issues in standard Slovene.

He died in Ljubljana.

References

1910 births
1993 deaths
Slavists
Linguists from Slovenia
Etymologists
Toponymists
People from the Municipality of Litija
20th-century linguists